Festus Igbinoghene (born 21 October 1969) is a Nigerian athlete. He competed in the men's triple jump at the 1996 Summer Olympics.

He attended Mississippi State University as a long jumper and triple jumper. Igbinoghene won five SEC titles in the triple jump and long jump. He earned a bronze medal at the 1990 Commonwealth Games.

Personal life
His son Noah Igbinoghene (born 1999) is an American football cornerback for the Miami Dolphins of the National Football League (NFL), after being drafted in the first round of the 2020 NFL Draft. His wife Faith Igbinoghene earned a bronze medal in the 1992 Summer Olympics as a part of the Nigerian women's 4 x 100 relay team.

References

1969 births
Living people
Athletes (track and field) at the 1996 Summer Olympics
Nigerian male triple jumpers
Olympic athletes of Nigeria
Place of birth missing (living people)
Commonwealth Games medallists in athletics
Commonwealth Games bronze medallists for Nigeria
Athletes (track and field) at the 1990 Commonwealth Games
Mississippi State Bulldogs men's track and field athletes
20th-century Nigerian people
Medallists at the 1990 Commonwealth Games